Buddha Mar Gaya is a 2007 Bollywood black comedy film by  Rahul Rawail.  It Stars Anupam Kher, Rakhi Sawant, Om Puri and Paresh Rawal. Buddha Mar Gaya was released on 17 August 2007.

Plot
Laxmikant Kabadiya is one of India's richest industrialists, a self-made man who's risen from selling scrap to become a construction magnate. His conglomerate is on the verge of a 5000 crore ($1 billion) IPO that should make them one of the largest companies in the country. LK's family - his spinster twin sister Prernahumor,, his two sons Ranjeet and Sameer, their wives Shruti and Anju (Mona Ambegaonkar) respectively and Ranjeet's daughters Sanjana and Namrata, and Sameer's son, Pawan, can't stop salivating at the thought of all that money.

Unfortunately for all of them fate displays a wicked sense of humour. On the night before the IPO opens, LK dies while copulating with a starlet Kim, who's aspiring to become the heroine of a film that LK plans to produce. The family is distraught and horrified. Not because a loved one has died but because now no one will buy their shares. So, on the advice of their family guru - Vidyut Baba, the family decides to hide the death of LK for a period of two days till the shares are all sold out. Little do they realize the crazy series of events that will follow on account of this duplicity.

After all, hiding the death of a man as famous as LK is a Herculean task. To make matters worse, every time they're ready to announce LK's death, fate intervenes forcing them to keep his death hidden for another couple of days. This results in them having to announce the death of a fictitious friend or relative of LK and stage fake funerals. Which of course means generating dead bodies and, worse, getting the dead LK to make appearances at these funerals.

Cast

Anupam Kher as  Laxmikant 'LK' Kabadiya
Paresh Rawal as Ramu
Om Puri as Vidyut 'Vidya' Baba
Rakhi Sawant as  Kim / Vishkanya
 Mahabanoo Mody-Kotwal as Prerna 'Bua' Kabadiya
Ranvir Shorey as Munna
Mukesh Tiwari as Sameer L. Kabadiya
Mona Ambegaonkar as Anju Kabadiya
Murli Sharma as Rohan Alexander
Mannat Kaur as Shruti
Madhavi Singh as Namrata
Heena Biswas as Sanjana
Jay Soni as Pawan
Jitender Bhargava
Bobby Parvez as Ranjeet L. Kabadiya
Manoj Joshi as ACP Ashwini Khandekar
Birbal as  Havaldar
Prem Chopra as Prem Chopra
Pratima Kazmi as Police Inspector
Vinay Pathak
 Raj Tilak as Malwankar

Reception
Khalid Mohamed of Hindustan Times gave it 1.5 stars and described it as a "hyper-VULGAR comedy". Syed Firdaus Ashraf of Rediff.com gave the film 1 star out 5, writing ″Director Rawail's fantasies are appalling; he shows a rocket taking off or injections dripping whenever Rakhi is in bed. The film's tag line, 'You will die laughing' should have been 'You will die crying'. It's about time Rawail, who once made decent films like Betaab, Arjun and Dacait, retires from direction.″ Shubhra Gupta of The Indian Express wrote ″The trouble with Rahul Rawail's movie is not its premise: that old men can also have a good time in bed, even though most of us, like good hypocritical Indians, would be horrified at admitting it. It's in the execution, which falls uneasily between crass and classy: the audience doesn't quite know whether to laugh or to cringe. Is this the same man who gave us the polished thrillers, Arjun and Dacait?″

Taran Adarsh of Bollywood Hungama gave it three stars out of five and concluded that it "has terrific title-value, abundant shock-value and strong entertainment-value as factors going in its favor".

References

External links
 

2007 films
2000s Hindi-language films
Films directed by Rahul Rawail
Indian comedy films
2007 comedy films
Hindi-language comedy films